The Mask of Cesare Borgia (Italian: La maschera di Cesare Borgia) is a 1941 Italian historical drama film directed by Duilio Coletti and starring Osvaldo Valenti, Elsa De Giorgi and Carlo Tamberlani. Coletti asserted that the 1948 20th Century Fox film Prince of Foxes was a remake of his work, the American studio having bought the rights, although the latter film's source is credited as a novel of the same title by Samuel Shellabarger.

It was shot at the Cinecittà Studios in Rome. The film's sets were designed by the art directors Antonio Tagliolini and Enrico Verdozzi.

Cast

References

Bibliography 
 Alberto Anile. Orson Welles in Italy. Indiana University Press, 2013.

External links 
 

1941 films
Italian historical films
1940s historical films
1940s Italian-language films
Films directed by Duilio Coletti
Italian black-and-white films
Films shot at Cinecittà Studios
Adaptations of works by Niccolò Machiavelli
1940s Italian films